Bartosz Jaroch (born 25 January 1995) is a Polish professional footballer who plays as a right-back for I liga club Wisła Kraków. He is the son of fellow footballer Waldemar Jaroch and cousin of Gracjan Jaroch.

References

1995 births
Living people
Polish footballers
People from Przemyśl
Sportspeople from Podkarpackie Voivodeship
Association football fullbacks
Poland youth international footballers
Polonia Przemyśl players
Czuwaj Przemyśl players
Resovia (football) players
Radomiak Radom players
Olimpia Grudziądz players
Podbeskidzie Bielsko-Biała players
Znicz Pruszków players
Wisła Kraków players
III liga players
II liga players
I liga players
Ekstraklasa players